Nikolaos "Nikos" Vlasopoulos (born 30 May 1988) is a Greek football midfielder.

Career
He played for Thyella first team for 3 seasons, from 2005–2006 to 2007–2008, and as of 13 June 2008 he was a Larissa player with a 5-year contract. He was released on a free in July 2010 and on 31 August 2010 he signed a contract with Panserraikos F.C. On 21 December 2010 Panachaiki announced that Vlasopoulos signed a four-year contract with the club.

References

External links
 Guardian Football

1988 births
Greek footballers
Athlitiki Enosi Larissa F.C. players
Living people
Association football midfielders
Footballers from Serres